San Francisco District is one of eight districts of the province Ambo in Peru.

References